Propionycha is a genus of beetles in the family Carabidae, containing the following species:

 Propionycha argentinica Liebke, 1928
 Propionycha bruchi Liebke, 1928

References

Ctenodactylinae